Radio Listening Posts were established by the Federal Communications Commission within the United States to listen to radio traffic during World War II. One of these was at Scituate, Rhode Island. Others were at Fort Ward (Washington), Winter Harbor, Maine, Amagansett, New York, Cheltenham, Maryland and Jupiter, Florida.

About one year before the United States entered WW2 Thomas B. Cave was sent to Rhode Island to set up a secret radio listening post. The purpose of the post was to detect radio transmissions from German spies in the United States and assist in locating downed aircraft. In March 1941 he abandoned his first choice of Greenville, RI for a farmhouse with 183 acres of land located on Darby Road near Chopmist Hill in Scituate, Rhode Island. The FCC leased the farmhouse from Mr. William A. Suddard.

The completed listening post contained over 80,000 feet of wire, 11 antennas and many advanced radio receivers. The site included two direction finding antennas. These could be rotated to get a bearing on the transmitting station. This information when compared with similar measurements from other distant stations allowed the transmitting location to be triangulated. The use of two of these antennas meant both parties in a conversion could be located.

Reception

The resulting listening site had characteristics way above what had been hoped for. A variety of signals was picked up with a regularity that cannot be explained. In Mr. Cave's words "This site was the best location in the country for radio transmission and reception".

This site as well as others was a well-guarded secret until the FCC authorized a reporter to visit the site in March 1945.

Countries heard

Caribbean
The quick response of this station allowed it to home in on German submarines in the Caribbean prompting the supervisor to state that "we were practically in on the kill" when describing the destruction of German Submarines.

Africa
From West Africa a large variety of clandestine radio transmitters was detected. In the African desert not only were the German command center-to-tank transmissions received but also tank-to-tank transmissions were clearly audible. The reception of these signals helped to turn the tide in the North Africa campaign.

South America
From South America spies transmitting back to Germany were detected and most countries cooperated in efforts to shut down the transmissions. The one exception to this was Argentina with its Pro Nazi Sympathies.

One report sent to German submarines contained the scheduled departure date of the Queen Mary as well as its intended route to Australia. The destruction of this ship along with its 14,000 soldiers would have been a heavy blow but this was prevented by the eavesdropping ability of Chopmist Hill.

Pacific Ocean
From the Pacific Ocean signals were picked up of TNT-carrying Japanese balloons that had been released to follow the jet stream to the United States. The positions of these balloons was transmitted to Allied forces who shot them down.

East Coast
On the East Coast of the United States from Labrador to Florida signals of lost planes were picked up. Their position was triangulated and instructions to the planes were transmitted to enable them to arrive in the United States. This action saved thousands of people including actress Kay Francis who was returning home after a USO tour.

Germany
Vital local weather reports for the Germany homeland were purposely transmitted on frequencies that did not reach England but these transmissions were detected at Chopmist Hill.

Disbelief from the Army
Approximately 127 tests were made to ensure the site was able to accomplish what it claimed to do. In one test a station was set up in the Pentagon with a wire hanging out a window to transmit a signal. The object was to see how long it would take various receiving stations to detect this signal. Chopmist Hill detected it in seven minutes.

Site for the UN
When the war ended Chopmist Hill's remarkable reception and transmission abilities led to its being considered as a site for the soon-to-be constructed United Nations Complex. This plan was abandoned when John Rockefeller donated funds to purchase a 16-acre site on the East River in New York City.

References

External links
 A post in Rhode Island 
 yankee magazine
 

Providence  Sunday Journal Magazine.     December 6, 1981

Providence Journal: 
November 23, 1945
April 21, 1983 
February 21, 1951 
February 11, 1946

All the above from the Providence Journal of Providence, RI.
 https://nowapproachingprovidence.wordpress.com/2016/01/14/short-story-reseach-intro-and-scituate-resevior/

Military installations in Rhode Island